Teddy Williams may refer to:

Teddy Williams (American football) (born 1988), American football cornerback
Teddy Williams (rugby union) (born 2000), Welsh rugby union player.
Teddy Williams (tennis) (born 1866), British tennis player active in the 19th century.
Luke Williams (wrestler) (born 1947)
Eduardo Williams (born 1987), Argentine film director nicknamed "Teddy"

See also
Ted Williams (disambiguation)
Edward Williams (disambiguation)